Çavuşlu is a village in the Midyat District of Mardin Province in Turkey. The village is populated by Kurds of the Kercoz tribe and by the Mhallami. It had a population of 2,836 in 2022.

History 
Çavuşlu is a former Assyrian settlement that is mainly populated by the Mhallami  with some Kurdish families. The village has experienced a population loss in recent years due to economic migration.

References 

Villages in Midyat District
Kurdish settlements in Mardin Province
Historic Assyrian communities in Turkey
Mhallami villages